Arthur St. Norman (20 October 1878 – 18 May 1956) was a South African long-distance runner. He competed in the marathon and the 10km walk at the 1912 Summer Olympics.

References

1878 births
1956 deaths
Sportspeople from Brighton
Athletes (track and field) at the 1912 Summer Olympics
South African male long-distance runners
South African male racewalkers
South African male marathon runners
Olympic athletes of South Africa
Emigrants from the United Kingdom to Transvaal Colony